List of airports in Saint Lucia, sorted by location.



List

See also 

 Transport in Saint Lucia
 List of airports by ICAO code: T#TL - Saint Lucia
 Wikipedia: WikiProject Aviation/Airline destination lists: North America#Saint Lucia

External links 
 Lists of airports in Saint Lucia:
 Great Circle Mapper
 Aircraft Charter World
 The Airport Guide
 World Aero Data
 St Lucia Airport - UVF & SLU

 
Saint Lucia
Airports
Saint Lucia